Apiolae (also Appiolae) was a town in ancient Latium, Italy.

During the early semi-legendary history of Rome, in the reign of Rome's fifth king, Lucius Tarquinius Priscus, it is said that the Latins went to war with Rome.  Tarquinius took Apiolae by storm, and from there returned to Rome with much booty.

Sources
Livy, Ab urbe condita, 1:35

Roman towns and cities in Italy
Latin cities